The 2021 FIM Moto2 World Championship was a part of the 73rd F.I.M. Road Racing World Championship season. Remy Gardner won the world championship in the final race at Valencia. This season also saw the retirement of the intermediate class veteran Thomas Lüthi, as well the final season a 250cc-era debutant participated in the intermediate class.

Teams and riders

All teams used series-specified Dunlop tyres and Triumph 765cc 3-cylinder engines.

Team changes 
 On 27 November 2020, Mandalika Racing Team Indonesia entered the series partnering with SAG Team under the name "Pertamina Mandalika SAG Team" and retaining the existing SAG Team riders Thomas Lüthi and Kasma Daniel. Kasma Daniel later decided not to compete with the team any longer and had his contract terminated on mutual consent with the team. Bo Bendsneyder was his replacement 

 Onexox TKKR withdrew from the Moto2 world championship on 1 December 2020 due to sponsorship difficulties, and would focus on their other championship activities as well as planning to enter FIM CEV Repsol Moto2 for the year 2021 and would try coming back to Moto2 in 2022 as a team.

Rider changes
Jorge Martin moved up to the premier class joining Pramac Racing.
Thomas Lüthi joined Pertamina Mandalika SAG Team, replacing Remy Gardner who moved to Red Bull KTM Ajo.
Raul Fernandez moved up from Moto3 joining Red Bull KTM Ajo patterning with Remy Gardner.
Tony Arbolino moved up from Moto3, joining Intact GP.
Barry Baltus moved up from Moto3, joining NTS RW Racing GP.
Fabio Di Giannantonio returned to Gresini Racing, replacing Edgar Pons. Di Giannantonio previously competed with them in Moto3 from 2016 to 2018. He is replaced by the Moto2 European Champion Yari Montella.
Lorenzo Baldassarri switched places with Stefano Manzi to return to Forward Racing. Baldassarri had previously competed with them in Moto2 from 2015 to 2017.
Albert Arenas moved up from Moto3 while remaining with Aspar Team.
Joe Roberts moved to Italtrans to replace Enea Bastianini, who moved up to MotoGP with Esponsorama.
5-time reigning AMA Superbike champion Cameron Beaubier entered Moto2 with American Racing.
Ai Ogura moved up from Moto3 with Honda Team Asia and replaced Andi Farid Izdihar who moves down to Moto3.
Bo Bendsneyder joined Pertamina Mandalika SAG Team, replacing Kasma Daniel. Bendsneyder was previously set to race in the Supersport World Championship after leaving NTS RW Racing GP. Hafizh Syahrin later joined the team to replace Bendsneyder.
Celestino Vietti moved up from Moto3 joining Sky Racing Team VR46 replacing Luca Marini who moved up to the premier class joining Esponsorama Racing.

Mid-season changes
 Tommaso Marcon replaced Simone Corsi for the Doha round because of an injury.
 Miquel Pons replaced Simone Corsi for the Portuguese round because of an injury.
 Fraser Rogers replaced Barry Baltus for the Portuguese round because of a fractured left wrist.
 Taiga Hada replaced Barry Baltus for the Spanish round because of a fractured left wrist.
 Yari Montella missed several Grands Prix due to injuries. Alonso López replaced him for the French and Catalan rounds, while Fermín Aldeguer replaced him for the Italian and German rounds. He was cleared to race during the British Grand Prix, but was suspended by his own team due to concerns with his injury. Aldeguer replaced him for that round and the succeeding Aragonese round. Speed Up eventually terminated Montella's contract after the San Marino Grand Prix and was replaced by Aldeguer for the rest of the season.
 Alonso López replaced Héctor Garzó for the German round because of burns suffered from a previous crash.
 Lorenzo Baldassarri missed the Dutch round after having surgery on his fractured hand sustained during the preceding German round. He was replaced by Manuel González. Baldassarri returned to race the next three rounds, but was replaced again by González during the Aragonese round to prioritise his recovery.
 Jake Dixon raced in MotoGP for Petronas Yamaha SRT as a replacement for the injured Franco Morbidelli during the British and Aragon Grands Prix. Adam Norrodin and  John McPhee replaced Dixon for the British and Aragonese rounds, respectively.
 Lorenzo Dalla Porta underwent surgery prior to the Grand Prix of the Americas and was forced to miss the rest of the season. Tetsuta Nagashima replaced him for the remaining races, except the Emilia Romagna round, where Mattia Casadei replaced Dalla Porta.
 Hafizh Syahrin missed the Emilia Romagna round because of family problems that prevented him from leaving his home country Malaysia. He was replaced by Tommaso Marcon for the round.

Calendar 
The following Grands Prix took place in 2021:

Grand Prix locations

Calendar changes 
 The Finnish Grand Prix was due to be reintroduced to the calendar after a 38-year absence. The venue hosting the round was to be the new Kymi Ring, instead of the Tampere Circuit used in 1962 and 1963, or the Imatra Circuit which hosted the round until 1982. The Finnish Grand Prix had been included on the 2020 calendar, but the inaugural race was cancelled in response to the COVID-19 pandemic.
The Czech Republic Grand Prix was initially left off the provisional calendar, as the circuit requires mandatory resurfacing for safety compliance, and it was unclear if the necessary work could be completed in time for its typical schedule date in early August. The 11th round of the championship was therefore left open as provisionally pending. On 8 December 2020, Brno city councillors opted out of the 2021 calendar, citing financial difficulties due to the COVID-19 pandemic. It marked the first absence of a Grand Prix in Brno since 1992. The mayor of Brno hopes for the return of the championship in 2022.

Calendar changes as a reaction to COVID-19 pandemic 
With the uncertainty of the development of the COVID-19 pandemic, championship organizer Dorna elected in November 2020 to nominate three "Reserve Grand Prix Venues" which could be used in the event that local virus containment measures or regulations force the cancellation of a planned Grand Prix.
The Portuguese Grand Prix at Algarve had previously returned to the schedule as a replacement race for the final round of the COVID-19 shortened 2020 season.
The Indonesian Grand Prix was originally planned to be reintroduced to the main calendar after a 23-year absence before being designated a Reserve Grand Prix for 2021. The venue hosting the round would be the new Mandalika International Street Circuit, instead of the Sentul International Circuit used in 1996 and 1997.
A Russian Grand Prix would see the inaugural motorcycle Grand Prix in that country. The Igora Drive circuit would be used.
On 22 January 2021, Dorna significantly updated the provisional calendar including the following changes:
The Argentine and American Grands Prix would be postponed due to the COVID-19 situation in both countries, with potential rescheduling for the final quarter of 2021.
A double-header would open the season in Qatar on 28 March and 4 April, followed by Portugal as the third round.
The provisionally pending race created by the absence of the Czech Grand Prix was removed.
The potential Russian Grand Prix was removed from the reserve list, leaving Indonesia as the sole Reserve Grand Prix Venue.
On 14 May the Finnish Grand Prix was cancelled due to the COVID-19 situation, and the Styrian Grand Prix would replace it on the date of 8 August. It was also confirmed that the Indonesian Grand Prix would remain a reserve Grand Prix in the 2021 calendar, subject to circuit homologation.
On 23 June the Japanese Grand Prix was cancelled due to the COVID-19 situation, with the previously postponed Grand Prix of the Americas taking its place in the calendar. This also led to the postponement of the Thailand Grand Prix by one week.
On 6 July the Australian Grand Prix was cancelled due to the COVID-19 situation, with the Malaysian Grand Prix brought forward by a week to replace it on the date of 24 October. In addition, a new Grand Prix, the Algarve Grand Prix, was introduced, which is scheduled to be held on 7 November.
On 21 July the Thailand Grand Prix was cancelled due to the COVID-19 restrictions in the country.
On 19 August the Malaysian Grand Prix was cancelled due to the COVID-19 restrictions in the country. For its replacement, a second Grand Prix at Misano was introduced, having the same schedule as the cancelled Malaysian round.
On 11 September the final championship calendar comprising 18 Grands Prix was confirmed. The Emilia Romagna and Rimini Riviera Grand Prix returned as the second Grand Prix at Misano, now having the shortened name of Emilia Romagna motorcycle Grand Prix. The previously postponed Argentine Grand Prix was also cancelled.

Results and standings

Grands Prix

Riders' standings
Scoring system
Points were awarded to the top fifteen finishers. A rider had to finish the race to earn points.

Constructors' standings
Each constructor received the same number of points as their best placed rider in each race.

Teams' standings
The teams' standings were based on results obtained by regular and substitute riders; wild-card entries were ineligible.

Notes

References

Grand Prix motorcycle racing seasons